Panagiotis Alevras (born: 16 January 1969) is a sailor from Athens, Greece. who represented his country at the 1996 Summer Olympics in Savannah, United States as crew member in the Soling. With helmsman Stavros Alevras and fellow crew member Stefanos Chandakas they took the 18th place.

References

Living people
1969 births
Sailors at the 1996 Summer Olympics – Soling
Olympic sailors of Greece
Sailors (sport) from Athens
Greek male sailors (sport)